The women's long jump event at the 2003 Summer Universiade was held on 26 and 27 August 2003 in Daegu, South Korea.

Medalists

Results

Qualification

Final

References
Results

Athletics at the 2003 Summer Universiade
2003 in women's athletics
2003